Garfield Monument may refer to:

Garfield Memorial in Cleveland, Ohio
James A. Garfield Monument in Washington, D.C.